This is the list of municipalities in Bilecik Province, Turkey .

References 

Geography of Bilecik Province
Bilecik